Sarliac-sur-l'Isle is a commune in the Dordogne department in Nouvelle-Aquitaine in southwestern France.

Toponymy

The name of the commune comes from that of a person of Gallo-Roman origin, Cærellius, followed by the suffix -acum, meaning "domain of Cærellius". The second part of the name, l'Isle, refers to the river Isle, which flows through the commune.

In Occitan, the commune is called Sarlhac d'Eila.

History

The territory of the commune has been occupied since the Gallo-Roman era.

The oldest known written mention of the location dates back to the 13th century and concerns its church under the name Sanctus Petrus de Sarlhac.

During the Middle Ages (14th century), the parish of Sarliac (Sarlhac) was part of the castellany of Auberoche.

On the Cassini map depicting France between 1756 and 1789, the village is identified by the name "Sarliat". In 1907, the commune of Sarliac took the name Sarliac-sur-l'Isle.

Population

See also
Château de la Bonnetie
Communes of the Dordogne département

References

Communes of Dordogne
Dordogne communes articles needing translation from French Wikipedia